Sened is a commune and small town in central Tunisia in Gafsa Governorate, and is also the name of the extinct Berber language (Sened) that was spoken there and at the nearby town of Tmagourt until the mid-twentieth century.  At the 2014 census it had a population of 9,581. In 1911, the whole town spoke Berber; by 1968, only the elderly did.

References

Communes of Tunisia
Populated places in Gafsa Governorate